This is a list of Royal Navy ship names starting with U, V, W, X, Y, and Z.

U

 U1407 
 Ufton
 
 Ulex
 
 
 
 
 
 
 
 
 
 
 
 
 Unbridled
 
 
 
 
 Unicorn Prize
 
 
 
 Unite
 
 
 Unity II
 Unity III
 
 
 
 
 
 
 
 
 
 
 Upas
 
 Uppingham
 
 
 
 
 
 Upward
 
 Uranie
 
 
 
 
 
 
 Urtica
 
 
 
 
 
 Utopia
 Utrecht

V

 
 
 
 
 
 
 
 
 
 
 
 
 
 
 
 
 
 Vanneau
 
 
 
 
 
 
 
 
 
 
 
 
 
 
 
 
 
 
 
 
 
 
 
 
 
 
 
 Vernon II
 Vernon III
 Vernon IV
 
 
 
 
 
 
 
 Vesuve
 
 
 
 
 
 
 

 
 Victory
 
 
 
 
 
 
 
 
 
 
 
 
 
 
 
 Vipere
 
 
 Virginian
 Virginie
 
 
 Visenda
 
 
 
 

 
 Vivo
 
 
 
 
 
 
 
 
 
 
 Vulcan II

W

 
 
 
 
 
  
  
 
 
 
 
 
 
 
 
 
 
 
 
 
 
 
 
 
 
 
 
 Wassenaar
 
 
 
 
 
 
 
 
 
 
 Weazle
 
 
 
 
 
 
 
 
 
 
 
 West Florida
 
 
 
 Wexford
 
 
 
 
 
 
 
 
 
 

 
 
 
 
 
 
 
 
 
 
 
 
 
 
 
 
 
 William & Mary
 
 
 
 
 
 
 
 
 
 
 
 
 
 Wivenhoe
 
 
 
 
 
 
 
 
 
 
 
 
 
 
 
 Woolf
 
 
 
 
 
 
 
 
 
 
 
 
 
 
 Wulastock
 Wyandra
 
 Wyvern

X

 
 

 Xenophon

Y

 
 
 

 
 Yealmpton
 
 
 
 
 Young Hebe
 Young Hoblin
 Young King
 Young Lady
 Young Lion
 
 Young Shish
 Young Spragge
 Ypres

Z

 Z4
 Z5
 Z6
 Z7
 Z8
 Z10
 Z30
 Z38
 
 
 
 Zealand

See also
 List of aircraft carriers of the Royal Navy
 List of amphibious warfare ships of the Royal Navy
 List of battlecruisers of the Royal Navy
 List of pre-dreadnought battleships of the Royal Navy
 List of dreadnought battleships of the Royal Navy
 List of corvette and sloop classes of the Royal Navy
 List of cruiser classes of the Royal Navy
 List of destroyer classes of the Royal Navy
 List of patrol vessels of the Royal Navy
 List of frigate classes of the Royal Navy
 List of mine countermeasure vessels of the Royal Navy (includes minesweepers and mine hunters)
 List of monitors of the Royal Navy
 List of Royal Fleet Auxiliary ship names
 List of Royal Navy shore establishments
 List of submarines of the Royal Navy
 List of survey vessels of the Royal Navy

Notes

References
 
 Lyon, David, and Winfield, Rif (2004). The Sail and Steam Navy List: All the Ships of the Royal Navy 1815–1889. London: Chatham Publishing. .
 Winfield, Rif (2009). British Warships in the Age of Sail 1603–1714: Design, Construction, Careers and Fates. Barnsley, South York, England: Seaforth Publishing. .
 Winfield, Rif (2007). British Warships in the Age of Sail 1714–1792: Design, Construction, Careers and Fates. Barnsley, South York, England: Seaforth Publishing. .
 Winfield, Rif (2008). British Warships in the Age of Sail 1793–1817: Design, Construction, Careers and Fates. (2nd ed.). Barnsley, South York, England: Seaforth Publishing. .

 U
Names U
Royal Navy U
Royal Navy ships U